Kaur Kender (born 27 May 1971) is an Estonian author and entrepreneur.

An advertising executive by profession, Kender entered the Estonian literary scene in 1998 with his debut novel "Independence Day" ("Iseseisvuspäev").

His writing is as controversial and provocative as his own life and personality – he has once said that sometimes he wishes that truck drivers and prostitutes would write more books because they have unusual stories to tell.

In early 2016, he was charged with writing child pornography and put on trial, but was later acquitted. 

Kender provided both input and investment to support his fellow Estonian author Robert Kurvitz first through his novel Sacred and Terrible Air (2013), and then later the development of the video game Disco Elysium, which had become a critical darling and financial success for Kurvitz's development team ZA/UM.

Bibliography
 Iseseisvuspäev (Independence Day) (1998)
 Yuppiejumal (Yuppiegod) (1999)
 Ebanormaalne (Abnormal) (2000)
 Läbi rahulike silmade (Through Peaceful Eyes) (2001)
 Check Out (2001)
 Pangapettus (Bank Con) (2002)
 Kuidas saada isaks (How to Become a Father) (2003)
 Raha (Money) (2002) (together with Rain Lõhmus)
 Comeback (2010)

References

External links
 Excerpts from "Through Peaceful Eyes"

1971 births
Living people
Estonian male novelists
20th-century Estonian novelists
21st-century Estonian novelists
Writers from Tartu